The second Mandala of the Rigveda has 43 hymns, mainly to Agni and Indra chiefly attributed to the Rishi . It is one of the "family books" (mandalas 2-7), the oldest core of the Rigveda, which were composed in early vedic period(1500-1000 BCE).

Witzel (1995) on the basis of internal evidence suggested that the second Mandala contains the oldest hymns of the Rigveda.

List of incipits
The dedication as given by Griffith is in square brackets
2.1 (192) [ Agni.] .
2.2 (193) [Agni.] 
2.3 (194) [ Apris.] 
2.4 (195) [Agni.] 
2.5 (196) [Agni.] 
2.6 (197) [Agni.] 
2.7 (198) [Agni.] 
2.8 (199) [Agni.] 
2.9 (200) [Agni.] 
2.10 (201) [Agni.] 
2.11 (202) [ Indra.] 
2.12 (203) [Indra.] 
2.13 (204) [Indra.] 
2.14 (205) [Indra.] 
2.15 (206) [Indra.] 
2.16 (207) [Indra.] 
2.17 (208) [Indra.] 
2.18 (209) [Indra.] 
2.19 (210) [Indra.] 
2.20 (211) [ Asvins.] 
2.21 (212) 
2.22 (213) [Indra.] 
2.23 (214) [ Brahmanaspati.] 
2.24 (215) [Brahmanaspati.] 
2.25 (216) [Brahmanaspati.] 
2.26 (217) [Brahmanaspati.] 
2.27 (218) [ Adityas.] 
2.28 (219) [ Varuna.] 
2.29 (220) [ Visvedevas.] 
2.30 (221) [Indra and Others.] 
2.31 (222) [Visvedevas.] 
2.32 (223) [Various Deities.] 
2.33 (224) [ Rudra.] 
2.34 (225) [ Maruts.] 
2.35 (226) [ Son of Waters.] 
2.36 (227) [Various Gods.] 
2.37 (228) [Various Gods.] 
2.38 (229) [ Savitar.] 
2.39 (230) 
2.40 (231) [ Soma and Pusan.] 
2.41 (232) [Various Deities.] 
2.42 (233) [ Kapinjala.] 
2.43 (234) [Kapinjala.]

References

External links 

 – English translation by Ralph T. H. Griffith

Rigveda